Pharomachrus is a genus of birds in the family Trogonidae. Pharomachrus is from Ancient Greek pharos, "mantle", and makros, "long", referring to the wing and tail coverts of the resplendent quetzal (the second h is unexplained).

The five species of this genus and the eared quetzal, the only living member of the genus Euptilotis, together make up a group of colourful birds called quetzals.

Species

 
Birds of Central America
Bird genera